The European Border Breakers Award (EBBA) was an annual prize awarded to recognise the success of ten emerging artists or groups who reached audiences outside their own countries with their first internationally released album in the past year. Winners of a European Border Breakers Award include Adele, Dolores O'Riordan, MØ, Tiziano Ferro, Lykke Li, Katie Melua, Damien Rice, Mumford and Sons and Dua Lipa. In 2019 the prize was renamed as the Music Moves Europe Talent Awards (MMETA).

Organization
The EBBA Awards were launched by the European Commission and are a European Union award. Since 2009, the awards are organised by Eurosonic Noorderslag and the award is presented at the Eurosonic Noorderslag festival.

Partners
European Broadcasting Union (EBU)
The European Talent Exchange Program (ETEP), which creates a network between European popular music festivals, facilitating the booking of European bands from outside their home country. It also gives information to the media about emerging European artists.

Selection of the winners

The artists or groups nominated for the European Border Breakers Awards are selected on the basis of the following criteria:
 The success of the first international release in European countries other than the home territory of the artist in the past year.
 Radio airplay given to an artist by the European Broadcasting Union (EBU) radio channels.
 The artist's success at European festivals (ETEP) outside of his/her home country.

Public Choice Award
Since 2010, an online vote takes place to choose which EBBA Award winner will receive the Public Choice Award, on top of the "regular" award. The first winner was Belgian singer-songwriter Milow. The German rock & roll band The Baseballs won in 2011. Selah Sue from Belgium won the prize in 2012.

The show
Since 2009 the award ceremony takes place every year in January, during the Eurosonic Noorderslag festival, in the Dutch city of Groningen, presented by BBC host and musician Jools Holland. EBBA Award winners perform live during the show, as well as during the festival itself. Winners from previous years are invited to perform as special guests. The ceremony is recorded by the public broadcaster NOS/NTR and broadcast through NPO 3. The show is annually broadcast on several European television channels.

Background
The EBBA Awards were initiated by the European Commission in 2004. With the awards, the European Commission aims to stimulate the cross-border circulation of popular music repertoire and to highlight Europe's great musical diversity. The European Border Breakers Awards are supported through the Culture Programme of the European Union, which seeks to promote cross-border mobility of artists and culture professionals; to encourage the transnational circulation of cultural and artistic output; and to foster intercultural dialogue.

List of winners

2004

2005

2006

2007

2008

2009

2010

Public Choice Award: Milow

2011

Public Choice Award: The Baseballs

2012

Public Choice Award: Selah Sue

2013

2014

2015

Winner Public Choice Award: The Common Linnets

Best festival act award (awarded for the first time at this edition): Jungle

2016

Public Choice Award: Carnival Youth

2017

Public Choice Award: Dua Lipa

2018

Public Choice Award: Kristian Kostov

2022 
The list of 2022 winners:
 Grand Jury MME Award 2022:  (Belgium)
 2022 MME Awards:
  (France)
Alina Pash (Ukraine)
Denise Chaila (Ireland)
Дeva (Hungary)
Blanks (Netherlands)
 Public Choice Award: Ladaniva (Armenia)

See also 
 MTV Europe Music Award for Best European Act
 European Parliament Lux Prize

References

External links 

 
 EBBA on the culture portal of the European Commission
 Website Eurosonic Noorderslag

Awards established in 2004
European Border Breakers Award